Solar energy in Poland includes the production of solar thermal energy and solar photovoltaics. 
Solar thermal, used for heating water, used  of installed solar thermal collectors at the end of 2014. This corresponds to about 1,200 MWth capacity. 
Solar collectors are the second largest source of renewable heat in Poland, after biomass heating plants. 
In 2014, Poland was ranked fourth in sales of solar collector installations among European countries.

The total solar photovoltaics (PV) grid-connected capacity in Poland was 12,189.1 MW as of 31 December 2022.

Photovoltaics

See also
Photovoltaic system performance
Solar power in Germany

References

Energy in Poland